Visteon Corporation (VC) is an American global automotive electronics supplier and Fortune 500 company spun off from the Ford Motor Company in 2000. Visteon is composed of multiple businesses that design, engineer, and manufacture vehicle cockpit electronics products and connected car services for a diversified customer base, including all of the major automakers worldwide.

Introduction 

Visteon is a spinoff from the Ford Motor Company, as Delphi is from General Motors. In 2017, Visteon had sales of US$3.146 billion and approximately 10,000 employees at more than 40 facilities in 18 countries. Since its independence from Ford, Visteon has set a corporate goal of expanding business with other companies, and now has a diversified customer base, working with all of the major automakers worldwide. Visteon's market share, market and revenue have changed substantially since it formed. A majority of revenue (80+%) came from North America, driven by its relationship with Ford Motor Company. Today, its revenue comes predominantly from Asia, North America, and Europe. In 2005, Visteon moved to new headquarters in Van Buren Township, Michigan.

Business 
Initially, Visteon participated in three main divisions: climate, electronics, and interior systems. With the sale of its equity interest in the Climate operations in mid-year 2015 and completed sale of its interiors business in 2016, Visteon re-focused on the high-growth cockpit electronics business with a focus on software and the connected car.  In 2015, Visteon introduced Sachin Lawande as the new president and CEO.

Operations

The company has three corporate offices reflecting the company's key markets.
 North American Corporate Office and Innovation Center, Van Buren Township, Michigan, United States.
 Asia Pacific Corporate Office and Innovation Center, Shanghai, China.
 European Corporate Office, Chelmsford, United Kingdom.

Products

Automotive Cockpit Electronics
 Instrument clusters
 Head-up displays
 Information display
 Audio systems
 Telematics
 SmartCore™ cockpit domain controllers
 Embedded multimedia
 Connectivity

Audio and Infotainment
 Audio head units
 Infotainment
 Visteon Dockable Entertainment
 Connectivity services
 Audio components

Vehicle Electronics
 Body, security and feature controllers
 Powertrain control
 High voltage/ Low voltage power control
 Domain controllers

Information and Controls
 Instrument clusters
 Displays
 ADAS
 Heads Up Displays
 Climate control heads
 Decorative control panels

Restructuring 

On September 13, 2005, Visteon and Ford reached an agreement whereby seventeen of the less-profitable Visteon plants and six offices would be transferred to an independent business entity called Automotive Components Holdings LLC. This action, intended to assure the long-term viability of Visteon, involved the transfer of 18,000 hourly workers and 5000 salaried workers to the new entity, reducing Visteon to approximately 52,000 employees worldwide and $11 billion in annual sales. Three of the plants are in Mexico, the remaining plants and six offices are in the US. Automotive Components Holdings (ACH), managed by Ford, was referred to as a "temporary entity", as its purpose was to prepare the plants and facilities for sale. By the end of 2007, all ACH operations had been closed, scheduled for closure, merged at least partially, or sold (two back to Ford), with transactions to be completed by the end of 2008 except for one plant which is to remain an ACH facility until its closure in 2009.

On March 31, 2009, Visteon's UK subsidiary was deemed insolvent, and placed into administration. The UK subsidiary had never been profitable, and the insolvency was the result of the US parent company being unwilling to continue to support the British operation. The administrators, KPMG, immediately moved to close all three Visteon UK factories and made 565 workers redundant. Visteon's profitable UK subsidiary Visteon Engineering Services (VES) remained unaffected by the restructuring.

As a result, workers occupied the plants in Belfast, Northern Ireland, and Enfield, London, and picketed the plant in Basildon, Essex, to gain better redundancy packages.

Bankruptcy and emergence 
The Subprime mortgage crisis greatly impacted the auto industry and left Visteon with little demand. During early March 2009, Visteon was delisted from the New York Stock Exchange for trading at extremely low levels. This action came after Visteon shares dropped from 7 to 2 cents. On May 28, 2009, the company filed voluntary petitions to reorganize Visteon Corporation and certain of its U.S. subsidiaries under Chapter 11 of the U.S. Bankruptcy Code. The case was heard in Delaware on May 29, 2009, by Judge Christopher Sontchi, where Visteon was granted Chapter 11 protection.

Visteon completed its reorganization and emerged from Chapter 11 on October 1, 2010.

Acquisitions 

In July 2014, Visteon acquired Johnson Controls electronics division for $265 Million. In July 2016, Visteon acquired AllGo Embedded Systems Pvt Ltd.

References

Companies listed on the Nasdaq
Companies formerly listed on the New York Stock Exchange
Manufacturing companies established in 2000
Manufacturing companies based in Michigan
Auto parts suppliers of the United States
Companies based in Wayne County, Michigan
Companies that filed for Chapter 11 bankruptcy in 2009
Corporate spin-offs